Get Organized with The Home Edit is a 2020 reality streaming television series.

Cast
Founders
 Clea Shearer
 Joanna Teplin

Guest stars
Reese Witherspoon (Episode 1)
Rachel Zoe (Episode 2)
Khloe Kardashian (Episode 3)
Eva Longoria (Episode 4)
Retta (Episode 5)
Neil Patrick Harris (Episode 6)
Jordana Brewster (Episode 7)
Kane Brown (Episode 8)

Episodes

Series overview

Season 1 (2020)

Season 2 (2022)

Release 
Get Organized with The Home Edit was released on September 9, 2020, on Netflix.

References

External links
 
 

2020s American reality television series
2020 American television series debuts
English-language Netflix original programming